Kurtkale is a village in the Çıldır District, Ardahan Province, Turkey. Its population is 213 (2021).
Near the village is the medieval castle of Mgeltsikhe meaning "Wolf's fortress" in Georgian. Kurtkale has the same meaning in Turkish.

References

Villages in Çıldır District